The 2016 UMass Minutemen football team represented the University of Massachusetts Amherst in the 2016 NCAA Division I FBS football season. This is their third year with head coach Mark Whipple. The Minutemen divided their home schedule between two stadiums. Three home games were played at Gillette Stadium in Foxborough, Massachusetts and the other three games on the UMass campus at Warren McGuirk Alumni Stadium. This was UMass's first season as an independent. They finished the season 2–10.

Schedule

The game between Massachusetts and Old Dominion on October 8, 2016, was rescheduled due to Hurricane Matthew. The game was moved a day sooner to October 7, 2016 with an 8:00pm kickoff.
Schedule Source:

Game summaries

Florida

Broadcasters: Tom Hart, Andre Ware, Cole Cubelic

Boston College

Broadcasters: Eric Frede, Andy Gresh

FIU

Broadcasters: John Rooke, Pete Brock

Mississippi State

Broadcasters: Eric Frede, Andy Gresh

Tulane

Broadcasters: Eric Frede, Andy Gresh

Old Dominion

Broadcasters: Ted Alexander, Andy Mashaw, Doug Ripley

Louisiana Tech

Broadcasters: Eric Frede, Andy Gresh, Hali Oughton

South Carolina

Broadcasters: Tom Hart, Andre Ware, Cole Cubelic

Wagner

Broadcasters: John Rooke, Pete Brock

Troy

Broadcasters: Matt Stewart, Tom O'Brien

BYU

Broadcasters: Dave McCann, Blaine Fowler, Lauren Francom

Hawaii

Broadcasters: Robert Kekaula, Rich Miano, Scott Robbs

References

UMass
UMass Minutemen football seasons
UMass Minutemen football